Kinpachi Yoshimura (born 20 March 1952) is a Japanese professional golfer.

Yoshimura played on the Japan Golf Tour, winning four times.

Professional wins (5)

Japan Golf Tour wins (4)

Japan Golf Tour playoff record (1–1)

Other wins (1)
1995 Kyushu Open

External links

Japanese male golfers
Japan Golf Tour golfers
Sportspeople from Kōchi Prefecture
1952 births
Living people